Zina Garrison-Jackson and Martina Navratilova were the defending champions, but competed this year with different partners.

Garrison-Jackson teamed up with Larisa Neiland and lost in semifinals to Patty Fendick and Meredith McGrath.

Navratilova teamed up with Manon Bollegraf and successfully defended her title, by defeating Fendick and McGrath 7–6(7–3), 6–1 in the final.

Seeds

Draw

Draw

External links
 Official results archive (ITF)
 Official results archive (WTA)

1994 Doubles
European Indoors - Doubles